This is a family tree of the Counts of Flanders, from 864 to 1792, when the county of Flanders was annexed by France after the French Revolution.

See also

County of Flanders - Other family trees

Flanders
 
House of Flanders